The Belgian provincial, municipal and district elections of 2006 took place on Sunday 8 October 2006. The electors have elected the municipal councillors of 589 cities and towns (308 in the Flemish Region, 262 in the Walloon Region and 19 in the Brussels-Capital Region) as well as the ten provincial councils. The voters in the town of Antwerp have also been able to vote for the city's district councils. In seven Flemish municipalities with a special language statute (Drogenbos, Kraainem, Linkebeek, Sint-Genesius-Rode, Wemmel, Wezembeek-Oppem and Voeren) and in the Walloon municipality of Comines-Warneton the aldermen and the members of the OCMW/CPAS council have also been directly elected.

It was the first municipal and provincial elections since the transfer of the competence with regards to the municipalities and provinces to the regions, also residents without E.U. citizenship could vote for the first time if they had registered to vote. The previous municipal and provincial elections took place on Sunday 8 October 2000.

City and provincial councillors are elected to a six-year term. Newly elected councillors took office in January 2007, with the term ending in 2013.

Points of notice are the result of the governing federal government coalition (liberal/social-democrat) - for whom a bad result could spell defeat in the federal general elections to be held no later than June 2007 - and the result of the Vlaams Belang party in Antwerp and the other Flemish towns.

Organisation
The municipal and provincial elections of 2006 were the first of its kind to be organized by the Regions instead of the federal government. The competence with regards to the municipalities and provinces was transferred from the federation to the Regions by special law of 13 June 2001.

The Flemish minister of the Interior Marino Keulen announced that the results of the elections held in the Flemish Region would be available in real time on the official dedicated government website www.vlaanderenkiest.be.

Municipal elections
These have taken place in Flanders, Wallonia and the Brussels Capital Region.
The municipal councils were elected by a very rare form of party-list proportional representation, the Imperiali highest averages method.

The parties presented themselves with lists of candidates. The number of candidates on the list usually was the total number of seats to be taken in the council. Each list received a random number, which was assigned by a lottery. Parties that had representatives in the regional parliaments, could receive a number that is the same in the entire region. Other parties' numbers varied from municipality to municipality. These numbers started after the regional numbers (8 and higher in Flanders, 14 and higher in Brussels, 6 and higher in Wallonia).

The regional list numbers:

Provincial elections
These have taken place in Flanders and Wallonia. In the Brussels Capital Region no provincial elections were held as Brussels is not part of any Belgian province, the provincial competences almost entirely being assumed by the Region, the Agglomeration and the Community Commissions.

The list numbers used were the same as for the municipalities.

Polls

Flemish region

Het Laatste Nieuws
The polls conducted by the Stemmenkampioen site of Het Laatste Nieuws and the Vrije Universiteit Brussel, yielded the following overall result for Flanders, compared to the 2004 regional elections (the last column displays the difference between the latest polls and that result):

The last poll not taking into account alliances dates from September 2006 and showed these results:

Standaard - VRT
The latest poll by De Standaard and VRT yielded the following overall results for Flanders, compared to the 2004 regional elections (the last column displays the difference between the latest polls and that result):

Antwerp
Poll by the Gazet van Antwerpen and VRT, taken between 31 January and 23 February 2006, compared to the 2000 municipal elections (the last column displays the difference between the latest polls and that result):

July and September 2006 polls conducted by the Stemmenkampioen site of Het Laatste Nieuws and the Vrije Universiteit Brussel, yielded the following result for Antwerp, compared to the 2000 municipal elections (the last column displays the difference between the latest polls and that result):

Walloon Region
A poll conducted by the RTBF and the Sud Presse in June 2006 showed the following results, compared to the 2000 municipal elections (the last column displays the difference between the latest polls and that result):

Charleroi

Results

Flanders

Provinces

The provincial elections are the only 2006 elections that allow for a national comparison, since in municipal elections not all parties run in all municipalities.

Municipalities

Most important conclusions are that Vlaams Belang achieves status quo in large cities as Antwerp, Brussels and Ghent but advances strongly in the countryside. The CD&V-N-VA gains nearly everywhere, VLD and Groen! lose nearly everywhere. The VLD was able to consolidate where they put forth nationally known candidates, like Guy Verhofstadt in Ghent and Vincent Van Quickenborne in Kortrijk. The SP.A-Spirit puts strong results in cities like Antwerp, Ghent and Ostend but has mixed results in other places.

Most coalitions before the elections can continue with a stronger backing, most notably in Ghent and Mechelen. An exception to this general 'rule' is Vilvoorde, where former prime minister Jean-Luc Dehaene loses his majority.

Antwerp

 In 2001 the VU-ID split up in 2 wings: the centre-right Flemish nationalist NVA, which formed a cartel with the Christian Democratic CD&V and the social-liberal Spirit which formed a cartel with the Socialist SPA.

Bruges

Ghent

Ostend

Districts (Antwerp)

Heavily anticipated were the results for Merksem, Deurne and Hoboken, where it was believed Vlaams Belang could obtain an absolute majority. This however did not turn out to be the case, even though the party does advance in all but two districts (Antwerp and Borgerhout). Most notably, in Hoboken a majority without Vlaams Belang will only be possible by including the extreme left PVDA, although another party, N-VA, has already ruled out such a coalition.

Wallonia

Provinces

Municipalities

Namur
In Namur, the capital of Wallonia, the Socialist Party (PS) lost 7.4% of its votes, enough for the local Christian-democrats (cdH), Liberals (MR) and Greens (Ecolo) to start a coalition, breaking with the 30-year Socialist hegemony there. Jacques Etienne of chH will become the new mayor.

Brussels

References

External links
 Brussels Official dedicated government website
 Flanders Official dedicated government website
 Walloon Official dedicated government website
 De verkiezingswedstrijd - Electoral posters
  Electoral leaflets and posters (site map for Brussels, Flanders, Wallonia), Tractothèque

2006
Local elections
October 2006 events in Europe